Frantic Romantic is the second album by American R&B singer Jermaine Stewart, released in 1986.  The album includes Stewart's biggest pop hit, "We Don't Have to Take Our Clothes Off", as well as the minor follow-up hit, "Jody", for whom Stewart's former Soul Train dance-mate Jody Watley was the inspiration. The album was re-issued on CD on October 18, 2010 by Cherry Red in the UK.

Track listing
 "We Don't Have to Take Our Clothes Off" (Narada Michael Walden, Preston Glass; Gratitude Sky Music/Warner-Tamerlane Music/Warner-Chappell Music-BMI/ASCAP) – 4:54
 "Dance Floor" (Jermaine Stewart, Roy Carter) – 4:45
 "Jody" (Stewart, Walden, Jeffrey Cohen) – 5:35
 "Versatile" (Stewart, Jakko J.) – 4:01
 "Frantic Romantic" (Glass, Walden, Glass) – 4:33
 "Don't Ever Leave Me" (Walden, Cohen, Stewart) – 5:03
 "Out to Punish" (Walden, Glass, Stewart) – 4:54
 "Moonlight Carnival" (Stewart, Jakko J., Glass) – 3:47
 "Give Your Love to Me" (Stewart, Jakko J.) – 4:25

Note
 The single edits of "We Don't Have to Take Our Clothes Off" are 4:38 and 4:05.

European track listing
 "We Don't Have to Take Our Clothes Off" – 4:54
 "Versatile" – 4:01
 "Moonlight Carnival" –	3:47
 "Don't Ever Leave Me" – 5:03
 "Dance Floor" – 4:45
 "Jody" – 5:35
 "Give Your Love to Me" – 4:25
 "Out to Punish" – 4:54
 "The Word Is Out" – 3:32
 "Frantic Romantic" – 4:33
 "We Don't Have to Take Our Clothes Off" (Special Extended Version) – 5:55
 "The Word Is Out" (West Mix – Extended Version) – 6:53

Outtakes:
 "Wear Out the Grooves", released on the Perfect soundtrack.
 "Don't Wait for the Boys" (written by Jermaine Stewart; Copyright BFG Publishing), released on A Tribute to Jermaine Stewart, Attention.

Charts

Production
Produced By Narada Michael Walden & John "Jellybean" Benitez
Engineers: "Llama" Dave Frazer, Gordon Lyon, Stuart Hirotsu, Mary Ann Zahorsky, Michael Hutchison, Fernando Kral, Mark Roule, Nick, Don Peterkofsky
Note: Back cover of album says "Produced, Reduced & Arranged By Narada Michael Walden.

Personnel
Drums and drum programming: Narada Michael Walden
Percussion: Gregory "G.G." Gonaway, Andy Narell, Mingo Lewis, Sammy Figueroa
Bass guitar: Randy Jackson
Synthesized bass: Randy Jackson, Walter Afanasieff, Preston Glass
Guitars: Corrado Rustici, Eddie Martinez
Keyboards, Synthesizers: Walter Afanasieff, Preston Glass, Jack Waldman
Saxophones: Marc Russo, Russell Tubbs
Trumpet and horn arrangements: Jerry Hey
Programming: Narada Michael Walden, Walter Afanasieff, Preston Glass
All instruments on "Give Your Love to Me" by Jakko J., GG Gonaway and Narada Michael Walden
Mastering Bob Ludwig at Masterdisk

References

1986 albums
Jermaine Stewart albums
Arista Records albums
Albums produced by Narada Michael Walden